David Bernhard is a judge of the 19th Judicial Circuit Court of Virginia (Fairfax), in the United States, elected February 23, 2017, by the Virginia Senate and the Virginia House of Delegates, for an 8-year term commencing July 1, 2017. He is only the second immigrant, and the first one from Latin America,  to have been elected Circuit Court Judge in Virginia. His election was preceded by an evaluation by the Fairfax Bar Judicial Selection Committee which issued an Executive Summary highly recommending his candidacy, followed by a favorable vote by the Fairfax Bar Association membership. Subsequently, state legislators of the Virginia General Assembly having precincts in Fairfax County, voted as later reported in committee, to unanimously recommend his approval to the full Legislature. Bernhard was sworn into office on June 30, 2017.

Early years and education
Bernhard was born in El Salvador and later sought asylum in the United States due to family endangerment from leftist guerrillas.

In 1980, Bernhard received his High school diploma from Northfield Mount Hermon School in Northfield, Massachusetts. In 1983, he graduated from Brandeis University in Waltham, Massachusetts, with a B.A. in Economics and Political Science. He completed his J.D. degree in 1985 at Washington University School of Law, in St. Louis, Missouri. He is fluent  in the English, Spanish and German languages.

Career
Bernhard was first admitted to practice law in  Maryland (1989), Virginia (1988), District of Columbia (1987), Missouri (1986). From 1991 to 2017 he was in partnership with attorney Cheryl E. Gardner at the law firm of Bernhard & Gardner. In 2005, Bernhard with Gardner, co-founded and until May 2017 co-moderated VADefenses Listserv, a criminal law resource.

Bernhard's trial practice included the handling of difficult cases such as a murder case which was only the second instance of a jury trial being televised in the history of the Fairfax Circuit Court, engendering debate as to the circumstances if any under which cameras ought to be allowed in a courtroom. Notable matters he handled include challenging admissibility of certificates of analysis offered without the presence of a technician in DUI prosecutions  and confronting problems with enforcement of Northern Virginia toll road civil penalty cases, in each case contributing to the enactment of changes to the Code of Virginia. His appeals include Virginia's first civil Gideon case, a cooperative effort with Clarence M. Dunnaville Jr., culminating in amending legislation expanding the right to counsel; the seminal Benitez decísion policing abusive litigation practices; and the Kim opinion, providing a bright line test as to when private property is subject to the traffic laws of Virginia applicable to "statutory highways." Bernhard helped reconstitute, and from 2011 to 2014, was Co-Chair of the Fairfax Bar Criminal Law Practice Section, serving for the last year in collaboration with Michael J. Lindner, for which effort he was recognized with a Fairfax Bar Association President's Award. In 2012 he was named a “Leader in the Law” by Virginia Lawyers Weekly.

Judge Bernhard has spoken about his improbable journey to becoming a judge and what it is like to serve as a judge. Upon assuming office he was an early proponent and implementer of developing evidence-based sentencing and pre-trial practices. Similar techniques are already in use by the Virginia Department of Corrections for incarcerated individuals, helping yield by 2019, the lowest inmate recidivism rate of any state. Bernhard has been in the forefront of the elimination of cash from consideration of whether and under which conditions criminal suspects should be released while awaiting trial. Since assuming office, he has declined to impose discretionary cash or surety bond release conditions on those accused of crimes, persuaded by judicial training he received under auspices of the Supreme Court of Virginia after his election of the emerging view that such monetary requirements often amount to "wealth-based detention" and do little to ensure public safety in the case of the dangerous,  while conversely serving in many instances to unnecessarily incarcerate those whose release poses little adverse risk that can instead be addressed through other pretrial terms. He has pointed to examples where the dangerous have been released merely because they have money, while individuals charged with misdemeanor offenses where they normally would not serve a jail sentence have been unnecessarily detained merely for being poor, finding there is no rational means for the implementation of cash terms in bail determinations. Since 2017, Bernhard has exercised judicial discretion to inform jurors during jury selection of the penalty ranges a defendant faces in the context of examining sentencing bias and reducing the chance of mistrials,  and set forth the practical benefits to justice of such practice, in writing. In 2020, the Virginia General Assembly resolved the controversy of whether juries should be so advised by mandating the right to such disclosure by statute. On August 14, 2020, Judge Bernhard joined all his judicial colleagues in adopting a landmark plan to promote racial equality and public confidence in the fairness of the Fairfax Circuit Court. Bernhard has often addressed matters of first impression in Letter Opinion judicial decisions, which in Virginia constitute persuasive authority. Several of his opinions have led to affirmances by appellate courts.

Notable opinions
Among Bernhard's notable judicial opinions are: determining probation officers may make sentencing recommendations in their reports; justifying the exercise of the Court's discretion in voir dire to inform jurors of applicable penalty ranges to prevent sentencing bias and mistrials (now required by statute); analyzing when words of a civilian may make such person a police agent effecting an arrest; evaluating whether a subcontractor in a commercial transaction may be subjected to liability under the Virginia Consumer Protection Act; determining the reach of litigation sanctions to a "represented party" in application of the alter ego doctrine; holding when medical causation testimony is unnecessary to commit the decision as to guilt for a crime to a jury; adopting a partial loan subordination approach for analyzing the impact of liens with a circuity of priority; interpreting the scope of statutory preemption of negligence and conversion claims in the context of a fraudulent wire transfer of funds; determining when declaratory judgment actions may be maintained ancillary to administrative adjudications; finding a governor of a requesting state may act through an agent in extradition proceedings; determining that in judicial proceedings to sell tax delinquent realty the liens against properties subject to sale must be determined by the time of entry of the decree of confirmation of sale; holding a court could not vacate a previously granted nolle prosequi as such grant divested jurisdiction over the criminal  offense charged; ruling a grantor-beneficiary could encumber land with an easement in his individual capacity as a partial revocation of the transfer of such estate into a revocable trust; delineating when a residential driveway is subject to prohibition of warrantless arrests thereon; finding an implied-in-fact agreement erased support arrearages; holding "challenger pays" attorneys' fees contract clauses are void as against public policy; analyzing and rejecting application of the rule of the last antecedent, and determining unlicensed noncommercial Lenders are subject to the Virginia Consumer Protection Act; delineating the standard applicable for judicial restoration of gun rights; holding de bene esse depositions may be used in support of summary judgment; determining exercise of reservations of spousal support do not require a showing of material change in circumstances (this default since changed by statute); holding judicial waiver of jail time in the lower courts is binding in appeals de novo in the circuit courts as a matter of judicial estoppel; finding indigent appellants in unlawful detainer cases could not be required to post bond by the lower courts as a prerequisite for transmitting their appeal to the circuit courts for trial de novo; holding that a detainee in extradition proceedings is entitled to a limited mental health evaluation and restoration of capacity as a matter of due process; delineating when a required probationary condition may be excused for inability to comply; holding that an easement for "ingress and egress" to a body of water and for "use" of a sea wall does not confer riparian rights; finding use of cash bail unconstitutional as-applied; delineating the broad scope of the constitutional and statutory power of Commonwealth’s Attorneys to prosecute criminal offenses in Virginia; granting a defense request as a matter of judicial discretion promoting courtroom neutrality, to conduct a jury trial devoid of a symbolically skewed backdrop of portraits that favor any race, which could unintentionally and mistakenly impart African Americans are of lesser standing in the dispensing of justice; holding that affirmative defenses adjudicated by plea in bar are not to be revisited anew at trial in most instances, detailing when spreading bamboo becomes an actionable nuisance and that the statute of limitations does not apply when relief sought is entirely equitable; delineating when "romantic partner" clauses are void as against public policy; determining a sole proprietor is not an "employee" under the workers' compensation law;  holding the court has the discretion to permit a defendant to retract a request for jury sentencing.

References

Living people
People from Fairfax County, Virginia
Virginia lawyers
Maryland lawyers
Lawyers from Washington, D.C.
Missouri lawyers
20th-century American lawyers
21st-century American lawyers
21st-century American judges
Northfield Mount Hermon School alumni
Brandeis University alumni
Washington University School of Law alumni
Year of birth missing (living people)